The Organization of Military Museums of Canada is a national organization for the promotion of military museums in Canada.

The OMMC was established in 1967 by a group of military museums, historians, and military history enthusiasts. It has over 40 individual and 60 institutional members including Canadian Forces museums, Parks Canada sites federal, provincial and municipal museums. The OMMC is a registered, charitable, not for profit organization which was incorporated as the Organization of Military Museums of Canada in 1992. Anne Lindsay is the President of OMMC Inc. As of 2022. The OMMC Head Office is located in Calgary, Alberta, Canada.

The OMMC is an umbrella organization for Canadian museums whose major purpose is the preservation and display of military artifacts, as well as for all other interested institutions and individuals. The OMMC is a federally incorporated, not-for-profit institution.

Programs
The OMMC is an association of peoples and organizations who operate military museums, promote the Military history of Canada, preserve and display military artifacts and militaria, and re-enact military operations.

The OMMC Inventory of Canadian Military Memorials in Canada was a millennium project to identify and record all Canadian military memorials in Canada.

The OMMC provides courses, meetings and other opportunities for members to explore common problems, provide instruction on new methods in museological practice and broaden the historical knowledge of museum staffs. The OMMC newsletter is The Bulletin.

Partners
The OMMC's partners include the Canadian Museums Association (CMA). Member organizations partner with local heritage organizations.

History
The Organization of Military Museums of Canada was incorporated in 1992. The OMMC fosters public awareness and promotes the enjoyment of Canada’s military history. The “Bezeau Report”, the OMMC strategic plan was presented to the membership in 1998.

Member Museums in Canada include

See also

List of conflicts in Canada
List of Canadian military operations
Canadian Forces
History of the Canadian Army
History of Canada
Military history
Colonial militia in Canada
List of Canadian Victoria Cross recipients
Canada and the American Civil War
Canada and the Vietnam War
Mackenzie-Papineau Battalion - Canada and the Spanish Civil War
Canada and NATO
Canada and the United Nations
Virtual Museum of Canada

References

External links

 The Organization of Military Museums of Canada
 Canadian Museums Association website
 Canadian War Museum
 Canadian Aboriginal Military Histories Digital Library
 CBC "Canada: A People's History" includes military history
 DND 101 (Department of National Defence primer)
 CBC Archives - Conflict and War
 CBC Archives - The 1991 Gulf War
  - Haldimand Collection . Index and abstracts of the 232 series. Primary source on the conflict between Great Britain and the thirteen colonies of America that became the United States (1756–1787)

Organizations established in 1967
Museum organizations
Non-profit organizations based in Ottawa
 

1967 establishments in Ontario